Neoregelia mucugensis is a species of flowering plant in the genus Neoregelia. This species is endemic to Brazil.

References

mucugensis
Flora of Brazil